Patriarch Alexander of Alexandria may refer to:

 Patriarch Alexander I of Alexandria, Patriarch of Alexandria in 313–326 or 328
 Patriarch Alexander II of Alexandria, Greek Patriarch of Alexandria in 1059–1062